Ciro Denza (Castellammare di Stabia, near Naples February 8, 1844 - 1915) was an Italian painter.

He was not formally trained in a formal Academy. He painted land- and sea-scapes of his native land. He exhibited often in Naples. In 1879, he exhibited in Turin, and from 1879 to 1884 in Florence and Rome.

References

1844 births
1915 deaths
People from Castellammare di Stabia
19th-century Italian painters
Italian male painters
20th-century Italian painters
Painters from Naples
Italian landscape painters
19th-century Italian male artists
20th-century Italian male artists